Koprivnik may refer to: 

In Kosovo:
Kopranik, a mountain known as Koprivnik in Serbian

In Slovenia:
Koprivnik Castle, a castle ruin above the village of Trojica, near Moravče in central Slovenia
Koprivnik, Kočevje, a settlement in the Municipality of Kočevje
Koprivnik, Kostanjevica na Krki, a settlement in the Municipality of Kostanjevica na Krki 
Koprivnik, Žiri, a settlement in the Municipality of Žiri
Koprivnik v Bohinju, a settlement in the Municipality of Bohinj
Kruplivnik, a settlement in the Municipality of Grad, in older sources also Koprivnik